Andrei Berki (born 7 November 1952) is a Romanian archer. He competed in the men's individual event at the 1980 Summer Olympics.

References

1952 births
Living people
Romanian male archers
Olympic archers of Romania
Archers at the 1980 Summer Olympics
People from Mureș County